"Won't Go Quietly" is a song by British recording artist Example. It is the second single from Example's second album of the same name, and was produced by The Fearless, composed of Alex Smith and Matt Furmidge. The song was available to download on 17 January 2010, with a physical single release on 18 January 2010. The song was used on 29 January 2010 by Channel 4 on Celebrity Big Brother 2010 as Stephanie Beacham's "Best Bits" song after her eviction and in France by W9 on the opening sequence of the French TV reality show Dilemme between 20 May and 15 July 2010.

Critical reception
Digital Spy gave the following review along with a three-star rating:

 "Well, he's clearly gunning for that all-important breakthrough hit with 'Won't Go Quietly', which combines a memorable enough pop hook ("She's electric, she's the current running through my veins") with throbbing  eurodance beats and a jagged bassline. Truth be told, it's hard to see where the "dysfunctional" element comes in and, if anything, this has a whiff of budget Calvin Harris to it. Still, if it's chart success Example is after, that could prove just the ticket."

BBC Chart Blog gave this review along with a four-star rating:

 "'Won't Go Quietly' is a very nowadays sort of a song, aimed at the same brainial pleasure receptors as almost everything Calvin Harris has released, with some smashing lyrics about not really wanting to get close to a lady, because she's probably going to turn out to be bad news, but going ahead and snuggling up anyway. It's not art, and it's not amazing but it'll do for now. Some songs are just here to help you pass the time in as enjoyable way as possible, until teacher gets back from the staff room."

Chart performance
"Won't Go Quietly" was released on 18 January 2010, and after strong radio airplay received increasing amounts of digital downloads.

Following the increased sales, the single entered the UK Singles Chart on 24 January 2010, reaching a peak of number six. This makes "Won't Go Quietly" Example's first top-ten single. On 31 January 2010, "Won't Go Quietly" dropped three places to number nine, limiting his stay in the top ten for two weeks.

On 5 February 2010, the single entered the Irish Singles Chart for the first time, reaching number 36 for Example's first hit in Ireland.

Music video
The music video for "Won't Go Quietly", directed by Ben Newman, features Example as a DJ rapping in front of a huge group of people dancing to the music, including British magician Dynamo.

Track listing

Charts

Weekly charts

Year-end charts

Certifications

References

2010 singles
Example (musician) songs
Eurodance songs
Songs written by Example (musician)
2010 songs
Data Records singles